The Coldwater Covered Bridge, also known as the Hughes Mill Covered Bridge, is a locally owned wooden covered bridge that spans the outflow from Oxford Lake (marble springs) in Calhoun County, Alabama, United States.  It is located at Oxford Lake Park off State Route 21 in the city of Oxford, about 4 miles (6 kilometers) south of Anniston.

Built circa 1850, the 63-foot (19-meter) bridge is a rare construction of Multiple King-post truss with Town Lattice over a single span.  The Tallahatchee Covered Bridge, which was also located in Calhoun County, had a similar resemblance.  Its WGCB number is 01-08-01.  As Coldwater Creek Covered Bridge, it was listed on the National Register of Historic Places on April 11, 1973.  It is currently the oldest existing covered bridge in Alabama. The bridge is maintained by the City of Oxford.

History
The Coldwater Covered Bridge was built by a former slave around 1850 (although some sources say it was built as early as 1839), originally located over Coldwater Creek on what is now Airport Road along the border of Calhoun and Talladega counties near the community of Coldwater (Coordinates  (33.585914, -85.913)).  This is about 8 miles (13 kilometers) west of its current location.  Nearby was Coldwater Mill, also known as Hughes Mill, a local saw and lumber mill owned by Peter N. Hughes and Humphrey Hughes.  The bridge partially burned in the early morning hours of August 11, 1920 but was able to be repaired and remain open to motor vehicle traffic.  A concrete and steel bridge eventually replaced the aging Coldwater Covered Bridge in 1974, which was soon left to temporarily survive the elements.  In 1990, the bridge was fully restored and moved to Oxford Lake Park.  The tin roof which was originally on the covered bridge has been replaced with a shingled roof.  It is now one of many visited tourist attractions within the Anniston area.

See also
List of Alabama covered bridges

References

 Dale J. Travis Covered Bridges. Coldwater CB: Credits. Retrieved Aug. 15, 2007.
 Bridges to the Past: Alabama's Covered Bridges. Coldwater CB: Credits. Retrieved Aug. 15, 2007.
 Alabama Bureau of Tourism & Travel. Coldwater CB: Credits. Retrieved Aug. 15, 2007.
 The Decatur Daily. Coldwater CB: Credits. Retrieved Aug. 15, 2007.
 Alabamiana: A Guide to Alabama. Coldwater CB: Credits. Retrieved Aug. 15, 2007.
 UglyBridges.com. Coldwater CB: Credits. Retrieved Aug. 12, 2013.
 The Anniston Star (August 11, 1920), page 5. Retrieved Aug. 12, 2013.
 LostBridges.org. Coldwater CB: Credits. Retrieved Aug. 12, 2013.
 Bridgehunter.com. Coldwater CB: Credits. Retrieved Aug. 13, 2013.
 The Southern Reporter. Coldwater CB: Credits. Retrieved Jun. 3, 2014.

External links
Bridges to the Past: Alabama's Covered Bridges
Coldwater Covered Bridge (Dale J. Travis)

Bridges completed in 1850
National Register of Historic Places in Calhoun County, Alabama
Covered bridges on the National Register of Historic Places in Alabama
Wooden bridges in Alabama
Transportation buildings and structures in Calhoun County, Alabama
Tourist attractions in Calhoun County, Alabama
Oxford, Alabama
Relocated buildings and structures in Alabama
Road bridges on the National Register of Historic Places in Alabama
Lattice truss bridges in the United States